The Student Health Action Coalition (SHAC) at the University of North Carolina at Chapel Hill (UNC) is the oldest student-run free clinic in the United States. It is run entirely by student volunteers from the Schools of Social Work, Public Health, Physical Therapy, Pharmacy, Nursing, Medicine, and Dentistry. The students, under the supervision of UNC doctors and professors, combine their skills to hold weekly dental and health clinics, provide rapid HIV testing services, and create sustainable community health promotion programs.

Wednesday Night Clinic
In 2004, the Coalition saw 740 patients, more than 600 of whom came from the immediate surroundings of Chapel Hill, Carrboro, and Durham. Of the total seen, 83% reported that they were not insured, and that the clinic was their only source of primary care.  Since its establishment in 1968, SHAC has attempted to redress differences in health indices between minorities and North Carolina’s Caucasian population; in 2004, almost 60% of the patients seen were Hispanic, and the majority of patients seen had at most a high-school-level of education.

Education and outreach
In addition to providing basic medical services, the Coalition performs the essential function of educating patients about healthy behaviors. The organization relies heavily on the training and resources available to its public health students for one-on-one patient counseling regarding diet, exercise, smoking cessation and sexual health. Annual educational and disease screening projects include well child clinics, Fiesta del Pueblo, and work at several other health fairs, including FestiFall, Apple Chill, and Effland’s Octoberfest. Ongoing outreach projects include diabetic foot clinics in Hurdle Mills and nutrition education and cooking sessions at Carrboro’s Club Nova.

HIV testing and counseling
SHAC also provides free, no-needle, rapid HIV testing services by trained counselors. HIV/AIDS education and personalized risk reduction is provided for all clients through pre- and post-test counseling. HIV testing is available for clinic patients and walk-in clients. In 2007, it tested over 400 people. The Coalition also provides services for those that test positive. It has firm links to both UNC Infectious Disease Clinic and social services for HIV positive people.

Pediatric healthcare
The Coalition receives and implements grants from North Carolina's branch of Reach Out and Read, which the organization uses to educate patients about child literacy and to provide pediatric patients with free reading materials. In 2004, SHAC performed clinic referrals for over a third of the patients seen, a fact which indicates the organization’s interest in connecting the patients it serves with other established medical organizations. It is also dedicated to integrating its patients into the existing primary healthcare system, and has been enrolling patients in the State Children's Health Insurance Program for several years.

References

Primary care
Medical and health organizations based in North Carolina
University of North Carolina at Chapel Hill student organizations
1968 establishments in North Carolina